Nonsense is an utterance or written text that does not in fact carry any identifiable meaning.

Nonsense may also mean:
Abstract nonsense, a term used by mathematicians to describe certain kinds of arguments and concepts in category theory
Nonsense mutation, a term in genetics for a point mutation in a sequence of DNA that results in a premature stop codon
Nonsense verse
"Nonsense", a song by Madeon featuring Mark Foster, from the album Adventure
"Nonsense (song), a song by Sabrina Carpenter from the album Emails I Can't Send
Nonsense (film), a 2016 film

See also 
Fashionable Nonsense, a 1997 book by physicists Alan Sokal and Jean Bricmont
Non-science